Grüneisen parameter  is a dimensionless thermodynamic parameter named after German physicist Eduard Grüneisen, whose original definition was formulated in terms of the phonon nonlinearities.

Because of the equivalences of many properties and derivatives within thermodynamics (e.g. see Maxwell Relations), there are many formulations of the Grüneisen parameter which are equally valid, leading to numerous interpretations of its meaning. Some formulations for the Grüneisen parameter include:

The Grüneisen parameter is dimensionless.

Grüneisen constant for perfect crystals with pair interactions 

The expression for the Grüneisen constant of a perfect crystal with pair interactions in -dimensional space has the form:

where  is the interatomic potential,  is the equilibrium distance,  is the space dimensionality. Relations between the Grüneisen constant and parameters of Lennard-Jones, Morse, and Mie potentials are presented in the table below.

The expression for the Grüneisen constant of a 1D chain with Mie potential exactly coincides with the results of MacDonald and Roy.
Using the relation between the Grüneisen parameter and interatomic potential one can derive the simple necessary and sufficient condition for Negative Thermal Expansion in perfect crystals with pair interactions  A proper description of the Grüneisen parameter represents a stringent test for any type of interatomic potential.

Microscopic definition via the phonon frequencies

The physical meaning of the parameter can also be extended by combining thermodynamics with a reasonable microphysics model for the vibrating atoms within a crystal. 
When the restoring force acting on an atom displaced from its equilibrium position is linear in the atom's displacement, the frequencies ωi of individual phonons do not depend on the volume of the crystal or on the presence of other phonons, and the thermal expansion (and thus γ) is zero. When the restoring force is non-linear in the displacement, the phonon frequencies ωi change with the volume . The Grüneisen parameter of an individual vibrational mode  can then be defined as (the negative of) the logarithmic derivative of the corresponding frequency :

Relationship between microscopic and thermodynamic models 
Using the quasi-harmonic approximation for atomic vibrations, the macroscopic Grüneisen parameter can be related to the description of how the vibrational frequencies (phonons) within a crystal are altered with changing volume (i.e. 's). 
For example, one can show that

if one defines  as the weighted average

where 's are the partial vibrational mode contributions to the heat capacity, such that

Proof
To prove this relation, it is easiest to introduce the heat capacity per particle ; so one can write

This way, it suffices to prove

Left-hand side (def):

Right-hand side (def):

Furthermore (Maxwell relations):

Thus

This yields

See also
 Debye model
 Negative thermal expansion
 Mie–Grüneisen equation of state

External links 
Definition from Eric Weisstein's World of Physics

References

Condensed matter physics
Dimensionless numbers of thermodynamics